The year 2014 was marked by the following events in science fiction.

Events 
 April - Lucasfilm announced that Star Wars expanded universe is no more considered Star Wars canon.
 End of the British magazine SciFiNow.

Deaths 
 February 16 : Michael Shea, American writer (born in 1946).
 March 18 : Lucius Shepard, American writer (born in 1943).
 May 12 : H. R. Giger, Swiss artist (born 1940)
 May 30 : Michael Szameit, German writer (born in 1950).
 June 1 : Jay Lake, American writer (born in 1964).
 June 15 : Daniel Keyes, American writer (born in 1927).
 June 30 : Frank M. Robinson, American writer (born in  1926).
 July 13 : Thomas Berger, American writer (born in  1924).

Literary releases

Novels 
 Annihilation, by Jeff VanderMeer.
 Ancillary Sword, by Ann Leckie.
   Imperfect Sword, by John G. Hemry.
  Steadfast, by  John G. Hemry.
  Involution, by Johan Heliot.
  Der Jesus-Deal, by Andreas Eschbach.
  Maul: Lockdown, by Joe Schreiber.
 Mentats of Dune, by Brian Herbert and Kevin J. Anderson.
 Catacombes and Hooligans, the two first novels of the trilogy  Les Particules réfractaires, by Mikhaïl W. Ramseier.
 Cibola Burn by James S.A. Corey
 Earth Awakens by Orson Scott Card
 War Dogs by Greg Bear

Novellas
The Churn by James S.A. Corey

Stories collections

Short stories

Comics 
 Brane Zéro, tome 1, first volume of the serie  Brane Zéro, written and drawn by  Mathieu Thonon.
 Réalité, second volume of the serie  Entre-Monde, by Yanouch.

Films

Original
 The Anomaly, by Noel Clarke.
 Area 51, by Oren Peli.
 Bugs, by Yan Jia
 Calculator, by Dmitry Grachov
 Divergent, by Neil Burger.
 Edge of Tomorrow, by Doug Liman.
 Extraterrestrial, by Colin Minihan.
 The Giver, by Phillip Noyce.
 Guardians of the Galaxy, by James Gunn.
 Interstellar, by Christopher Nolan.
 The Maze Runner, by Wes Ball.
 Lucy, by Luc Besson.
 Predestination, by the Spierig brothers.
 Project Almanac, by Dean Israelite.
 The Last Druid: Garm Wars, by Mamoru Oshii.
 Schnitzel, by Asaf Epstein.
 Space Station 76, by Jack Plotnick.
 Transcendence, by Wally Pfister.
 Zero Theorem, by Terry Gilliam.

Sequels, spin-offs and remakes
 Dawn of the Planet of the Apes, by Matt Reeves. 
 Monsters: Dark Continent, by Tom Green.
 RoboCop, by José Padilha.
 Transformers: Age of Extinction, by Michael Bay.

Television 
 The 100, by Kass Morgan and Jason Rothenberg. 
 2Day, created by Ben Wiener and Manu De Maleprade, directed by Ben Wiener.
 Ascension, by Philip Levens and Adrian A. Cruz. 
 Star Wars Rebels : season #1.

Video games 
 Elite: Dangerous, developed and edited by Frontier Developments. 
 Wasteland 2, developed and edited by inXile Entertainment and Obsidian Entertainment.
 Destiny

Awards

Hugo Award 

Best dramatic presentation (long form) - Gravity

Nebula Award 

Best novel: Ancillary Justice by Ann Leckie

Ray Bradbury Award: James Gunn and Nicole Perlman for Guardians of the Galaxy

Locus Award 

Best Science Fiction Novel: Abaddon's Gate by James S. A. Corey

Saturn Award 

Best science fiction film: Gravity

Grand Prix de l'Imaginaire Award

Prix Rosny-Aîné Award

BSFA Award

Sidewise Award for Alternate History

Arthur C. Clarke Award

Edward E. Smith Memorial Award

Kurd-Laßwitz-Preis

Seiun Award

Academy Award
 Gravity: 7 Oscars for best visual effects, Best Director, Best Original Score, Best Cinematography, Best Film Editing, Best Sound Editing, and Best Sound Mixing.
 Her for Best Original Screenplay.

See also 
 2014 in science

References

Science fiction by year

science-fiction